Patricia Ann Aufderheide is a scholar and public intellectual on media and social change, and an expert on fair use in media creation and scholarship. She is a University Professor at American University in Washington, D.C., where she has worked since 1989 and directed the Center for Social Media, later the Center for Media & Social Impact, beginning in 2000. She has received multiple awards and honors for her journalism and scholarship, including the John Simon Guggenheim Memorial Fellowship in 1994, and a Fulbright Research Fellowship in 1995, and a Distinguished Career Award in 2008 from the International Digital Media and Arts Association.

Education and career
Aufderheide attended the University of Minnesota, where she received a Ph.D. in history, writing her dissertation on "Order and Violence: Social Deviance and Social Control in Brazil, 1780-1840".

She was a senior editor at American Film magazine and the cultural editor at In These Times newspaper between 1978 and 1985, and a senior editor thereafter.  She has been a visiting professor at University of Brasília, Duke University, University of Illinois at Chicago and the University of Minnesota. In 1986-87, she worked as a policy analyst for the United Church of Christ, on telephone divestiture and its implications for poor and working people. Since 1989, she has taught at American University in Washington, D.C.

Publications

Aufderheide has authored several books, including Reclaiming Fair Use: How to Put Balance Back in Copyright (co-authored with Peter Jaszi), Documentary Film: A Very Short Introduction, Communication Policy and the Public Interest: The Telecommunications Act of 1996, and The Daily Planet: A Critic on the Capitalist Culture Beat.
 
She has published many academic journal articles, and has published prolifically as an arts journalist in publications ranging from major daily newspapers such as the Los Angeles Times, The Toronto Globe and Mail and the Boston Globe to cultural magazines such as Harper’s, Film Comment and Cineaste to partisan and issue publications such as The Nation, The Progressive and Mother Jones.

Awards 

She was awarded the John Simon Guggenheim Memorial Fellowship in 1994, followed by a Fulbright Research Fellowship in 1995 and in 2017. She was the Scholar-Teacher of the Year at American University in the 2004-2005 school year. She received the Preservation and Scholarship award in 2006 from the International Documentary Association, a career achievement award in 2008 from the International Digital Media and Arts Association, the Woman of Vision Award from Women in Film and Video (DC) in 2010, and the George Stoney Award for Documentary from the University Film and Video Association in 2015

Public intellectual role

On copyright, Aufderheide examines ways in which intellectual property law impacts the production, circulation, and consumption of media. She has argued, often in conjunction with Peter Jaszi, that the U.S. copyright doctrine of fair use is more available than many communities of practice currently make of it. Fair use is linked, in this argument, with free expression. Extensive research with a variety of communities of practice have demonstrated that link, as was documented in Reclaiming Fair Use. With Jaszi, she has coordinated successful efforts in  several communities of practice to articulate the best practices of a community on fair use. Reclaiming Fair Use documented that when communities have employed these codes of best practices and, through them, learned about the availability of fair use, their ability to make work more efficiently and effectively has increased, expanding free expression. These results were not anticipated by critics of the position that Aufderheide and Jaszi have taken. Lawrence Lessig for instance has argued that fair use is too undependable to be a reliable balancing feature of copyright, and that encouraging people to use it distracts from the mission to reform copyright law. Jennifer E. Rothman has argued that codes of best practices could constrain employment of fair use.
 
On media, Aufderheide has focused on both spaces and behaviors that foster exchange of public knowledge with the goal of resolving problems. In this she follows the argumentation of the American pragmatic philosopher John Dewey, who argued that the public exists to the extent people talk it into existence with others. She has analyzed the American institutions of public television, cable access television, and DBS set-aside channels, as well as the evolution of social-issue documentary from earliest days to interactive documentary platforms.
 
Aufderheide has connected these concerns with communities outside academia in a variety of ways. She serves on the boards of the social-issue documentary company Kartemquin Films and the Independent Television Service, a production entity majority-funded by the Corporation for Public Broadcasting. She has consulted with foundations including the John D. and Catherine T. MacArthur and the Ford Foundations. Her research on cable access television was used in a Supreme Court decision that permitted the continued existence of cable access.  
 
The Center for Media & Social Impact also showcases strategies and techniques for making impactful social-issue documentaries, through screenings, filmmaker visits, and an annual conference, Media That Matters. Funding for the Center has been provided by Annie E. Casey, MacArthur, McCormick, Surdna and Rockefeller Foundations, the Haas Family Trusts, and the National Endowment for the Arts.

References

External links 
 Profile Patricia Aufderheide at American University
 Pat Aufderheide | American University - Academia.edu
 Center for Media & Social Impact

Year of birth missing (living people)
Living people
American legal scholars
American University faculty and staff
University of Minnesota College of Liberal Arts alumni